Pueblo is an unincorporated community in Ohio Township, Spencer County, in the U.S. state of Indiana.

History
A post office was established at Pueblo in 1898, and remained in operation until it was discontinued in 1906.

Geography

References

Unincorporated communities in Spencer County, Indiana
Unincorporated communities in Indiana